Recruiting of Indigenous Workers Convention, 1936 is  a shelved  International Labour Organization Convention.

It was established in 1936, with the preamble stating:
Having decided upon the adoption of certain proposals with regard to the regulation of certain special systems of recruiting workers,...

Ratifications
Prior to it being shelved in 2018, the convention was ratified by 33 states.

External links 
Text.
Ratifications.

Shelved International Labour Organization conventions
Treaties concluded in 1936
Treaties entered into force in 1939